The Indianapolis mayoral election of 1975 took place on November 4, 1975 and saw the election of Republican William H. Hudnut III.

Hudnut ultimately served 16 years as mayor, becoming the city's longest-serving mayor.

Nominations

Democratic primary
Businessman Robert V. Welch defeated six other candidates in the Democratic primary. With a strong grassroots campaign, Welch won in an upset over frontrunner William Schreiber, the Marion County chairman.

Republican primary
Former congressman William H. Hudnut III won a decisive victory over two other candidates in the Republican primary.

General election
Jobs and crime management were top issues in the election.

Hudnut proposed improving the convention and tourism budget, better optimizing use of Economic Development Commission, and floated the possibility of using tax-free bonds as a means to enlarge the city's employment base. However, he named crime to be his top issue, and called for strong leadership, better police training, and more resident participation in crime fighting.

To address the high rate of unemployment among citizens between the ages of 18 and 30, Welch pledged to assemble all of the leaders of the community and "put the full power of the mayor's office" behind their efforts to address this. Welch promised he would hire a new police chief if elected, and also argued for more police officers to be placed on the street.

The election saw the city's lowest voter turnout in 13 years.

Hudnut's victory was credited to the impact of the creation of Unigov. The creation of Unigov had added predominantly Republican suburban areas of the county to the city of Indianapolis. Hudnut had won the "new city" (areas added to Indianapolis in the creation of Unigov) by 74,680 to 42,110, while Welch won the "old city" by 67,646 to 49,410. Hudnut's victory was also credited to the migration of people leaving the Indianapolis area, moving into bordering counties.

Three minor-party candidates were also running.

References

1975
1975 United States mayoral elections
1975 Indiana elections